Tadafumi (written: 忠文) is a masculine Japanese given name. Notable people with the name include:

, Japanese modern pentathlete
, Japanese samurai and politician

Japanese masculine given names